Second-seeded Thelma Long defeated Helen Angwin 6–2, 6–3 in the final to win the women's singles tennis title at the 1952 Australian Championships.

Seeds
The seeded players are listed below. Thelma Long is the champion; others show the round in which they were eliminated.

 Nancye Bolton (semifinals)
 Thelma Long (champion)
 Mary Hawton (semifinals)
 Beryl Penrose (quarterfinals)
 Nell Hopman (second round)
 Pam Southcombe (second round)
 Gwen Thiele (quarterfinals)
 Helen Angwin (finalist)

Draw

Key
 Q = Qualifier
 WC = Wild card
 LL = Lucky loser
 r = Retired

Finals

Earlier rounds

Section 1

Section 2

External links
 

1952 in women's tennis
1952
1952 in Australian women's sport